Edmundo Flores Mercado, Jr. is a Filipino footballer.

He previously played for the Philippines national team as a goalkeeper. He was part of the squad that played at the 2002 ASEAN Football Championship. In 2011, Mercado was playing as a goalkeeper for Philippine Air Force F.C. at the UFL Cup.

Mercado was also part of the Philippines national beach soccer team that participated at the Asian qualifiers of the 2013 FIFA Beach Soccer World Cup.

References

Philippines international footballers
Filipino footballers
Filipino beach soccer players
Philippine Air Force F.C. players
1974 births
Living people
Association football goalkeepers